Shah Waliullah may refer to:

Shah Waliullah Dehlawi, 18th century Indian Islamic scholar and reformer
Shah Waliullah Adeeb, current governor of Badakhshan, Afghanistan
Shah Wali Ullah Nagar, neighborhood in Orangi Town in Karachi, Pakistan